The Marrakesh Agreement, manifested by the Marrakesh Declaration, was an agreement signed in Marrakesh, Morocco, by 123 nations on 15 April 1994, marking the culmination of the 8-year-long Uruguay Round and establishing the World Trade Organization, which officially came into being on 1 January 1995.

The agreement developed out of the General Agreement on Tariffs and Trade (GATT), supplemented by a number of other agreements on issues including trade in services, sanitary and phytosanitary measures, trade-related aspects of intellectual property and technical barriers to trade.  It also established a new, more efficient and legally binding means of dispute resolution.  The various agreements which make up the Marrakesh Agreement combine as an indivisible whole; no entity can be party to any one agreement without being party to them all.

See also 
 The UN Global Compact for Migration treaty, developed in Marrakesh and New York conferences in 2018

References

External links
 An unofficial chart of the Marrakech Agreement (at WTO Cell, Government of the Punjab)

General Agreement on Tariffs and Trade
Agreement
1994 in international relations
Treaties concluded in 1994
Treaties entered into force in 1995
1994 in Morocco
Treaties of Antigua and Barbuda
Treaties of Argentina
Treaties of Australia
Treaties of Austria
Treaties of Bahrain
Treaties of Bangladesh
Treaties of Barbados
Treaties of Belgium
Treaties of Belize
Treaties of Brazil
Treaties of Brunei
Treaties of Canada
Treaties of Chile
Treaties of Costa Rica
Treaties of Ivory Coast
Treaties of the Czech Republic
Treaties of Denmark
Treaties of Dominica
Treaties entered into by the European Union
Treaties of Finland
Treaties of France
Treaties of Gabon
Treaties of Germany
Treaties of Ghana
Treaties of Greece
Treaties of Guyana
Treaties of Honduras
Treaties of Hong Kong
Treaties of Hungary
Treaties of Iceland
Treaties of India
Treaties of Indonesia
Treaties of Ireland
Treaties of Italy
Treaties of Japan
Treaties of Kenya
Treaties of South Korea
Treaties of Kuwait
Treaties of Luxembourg
Treaties of Macau
Treaties of Malaysia
Treaties of Malta
Treaties of Mauritius
Treaties of Mexico
Treaties of Morocco
Treaties of Myanmar
Treaties of Namibia
Treaties of the Netherlands
Treaties of New Zealand
Treaties of Nigeria
Treaties of Norway
Treaties of Pakistan
Treaties of Paraguay
Treaties of Peru
Treaties of the Philippines
Treaties of Poland
Treaties of Portugal
Treaties of Romania
Treaties of Saint Lucia
Treaties of Saint Vincent and the Grenadines
Treaties of Senegal
Treaties of Singapore
Treaties of Slovakia
Treaties of Spain
Treaties of Sri Lanka
Treaties of Suriname
Treaties of Eswatini
Treaties of Sweden
Treaties of Switzerland
Treaties of Tanzania
Treaties of Thailand
Treaties of Trinidad and Tobago
Treaties of Uganda
Treaties of the United Kingdom
Treaties of the United States
Treaties of Uruguay
Treaties of Venezuela
Treaties of Zambia
Treaties establishing intergovernmental organizations
Treaties extended to Aruba
Treaties extended to the Netherlands Antilles
Treaties extended to the Isle of Man
April 1994 events in Africa
Events in Marrakesh
1990s economic history